Pilocepheus is a genus of oribatid mites in the family Compactozetidae. Its only described species, Pilocepheus azoricus is endemic to the eastern half of the Azores archipelago.

References

Endemic arthropods of the Azores
Acariformes
Animals described in 1992